Kemerhisar is a belde (town) in Niğde Province, Turkey

Geography 
The population is 5,348 as of 2011.

History 

The earliest name of Kemerhisar was Tuwanuwa. It was an important Hitite city on the way to Cicilian Gates in Toros Mountains. During the Hellenistic age, the name was Tyana. It was briefly the capital of Cappadocia, the vassal of Roman Empire. Apollonius of Tyana, a contemporary of Christ, was born in Tyana. The town was an important settlement during Roman Empire domination and the  aqueduct, which is the symbol of the town, had been constructed by the emperors Trajan and Hadrian. After the town was incorporated into the Seljuk Empire in the 11th century, the Turks called the city Kilisehisar (Churchfort). The name was later replaced by the name Kemerhisar (Vaultfort), referring to the historical Roman aqueduct within the town.

Economy 

The main economic activity is agriculture. There are apple gardens and vineyards around the town. Onion and potato are also produced. Some Kemerhisar residents work in the sugar mill.

References 

Populated places in Niğde Province
Towns in Turkey
Bor District, Niğde